
Year 149 BC was a year of the pre-Julian Roman calendar. At the time it was known as the Year of the Consulship of Censorinus and Manilius (or, less frequently, year 605 Ab urbe condita). The denomination 149 BC for this year has been used since the early medieval period, when the Anno Domini calendar era became the prevalent method in Europe for naming years.

Events 
 By place 
 Roman Republic 
 The Third Punic War begins. The Romans land an army in Africa to begin the Battle of Carthage.
 Servius Sulpicius Galba is prosecuted for corruption while serving in Spain, but is acquitted after he parades his weeping family members before the tribunal.
Lucius Calpurnius Piso passes the lex Calpurnia de repetundis which establishes the first permanent criminal court in Rome.
 The turmoil in Spain escalates again with the renewal of the Lusitanian War, under the leadership of Viriathus, and the Celtiberian War.

 Macedon 
 Andriscus, the last king of Macedon, ascends to the throne.

 Bithynia 
 With Roman help, Nicomedes II overthrows his father Prusias II as king of Bithynia.

Deaths 
 Cato the Elder, Roman statesman (b. 234 BC)
 Prusias II, Greek king of Bithynia (b. c. 220 BC)

References